Mirriam Thenjiwe Kibi (born 25 January 1957) is a South African politician who was elected to the South African parliament at the 2019 general election as a representative of the African National Congress.

Parliamentary career
In 2019, she stood for election to the South African National Assembly as the first candidate on the African National Congress's Northern Cape regional list. At the election, she won a seat in parliament. Upon election, she became an alternate member of the Portfolio Committee on Cooperative Governance and Traditional Affairs and a member of the  Portfolio Committee on Public Service and Administration, Performance Monitoring & Evaluation.

References

External links

Living people
1957 births
Xhosa people
People from the Northern Cape
African National Congress politicians
Members of the National Assembly of South Africa
Women members of the National Assembly of South Africa
21st-century South African politicians
21st-century South African women politicians